4 male athletes from Morocco competed at the 1992 Summer Paralympics in Barcelona, Spain.

Team 
Morocco sent four sportsmen to the Barcelona Games.  The team included athletics competitors A. Abouzzad, and Mustapha Bouyahya, .

Athletics 
A. Abouzzad was scheduled to be in Heat 5 of the Men's 200 m TW4 event, but posted a DNS.  He posted a DNF in Heat 2 of the Men's 1,500 m TW3-4  event. Abouzzad  also started in the Men's Marathon TW3-4 event, posting a DNF. Bouyahya posted a DNF in the Men's 400 m TW4 event.  Competing in heat 2 of the Men's 1,500 m TW3-4 event, Bouyahya posted a time of 4:15.01.  He finished twelfth in a thirteen deep field.  He also competed in the Men's 5,000 m TW3-4 event.  He posted a time of 16:16.01 to finish last in his ten deep heat.  His last event was the Men's Marathon TW3-4, where he posted a DNF.

See also
Morocco at the Paralympics
Morocco at the 1992 Summer Olympics

References 

Nations at the 1992 Summer Paralympics
1992
Summer Paralympics